Rio Linda Airport  is a public-use airport located one mile (1.6 km) south of Rio Linda, in Sacramento County, California, United States.

Although most U.S. airports use the same three-letter location identifier for the FAA and IATA, Rio Linda Airport is assigned L36 by the FAA but has no designation from the IATA.

The airport is 7 nautical miles east of Sacramento International Airport and only two miles west of McClellan Airport.

Facilities & Aircraft 

There is an FBO on the field offering fuel and parking services as well as a lounge, restrooms, and a weather briefing station.

For the 12-month period ending December 31, 2018, the airport had about 20,000 aircraft operations, an average of 55 per day. All of it was general aviation. For the same time period, there were 139 aircraft based on the field: 136 single-engine and 3 multi-engine airplanes.

References

External links 

Airports in Sacramento County, California